Carlos Luis Rivero Milán (born May 20, 1988) is a Venezuelan professional baseball third baseman for the Tecolotes de los Dos Laredos of the Mexican League. He has played in Major League Baseball (MLB) for the Boston Red Sox.

Rivero was originally signed by the Cleveland Indians as an international free agent in 2005, and played for them for five minor league seasons (2006–2010) before joining the Philadelphia Phillies (2011) and Washington Nationals (2012–2013) organizations. He initially began as a strong-armed shortstop before being moved to third base, and has also spent time in left field. The Red Sox signed him in December 2013.

In between, Rivero played winter baseball for the Leones del Caracas, Bravos de Margarita and Cardenales de Lara clubs of the LVBP.

Career

Cleveland Indians
The Venezuelan infielder ranked among the 20-top Cleveland prospects from 2007 through 2009. He also was rated twice by Baseball America as having the best infield arm in the Indians organization in the 2008 and 2009 seasons, before being named the best defensive third baseman in the International League in 2012 while playing for Washington affiliate the Syracuse Chiefs.

Rivero earned International League All-Star honors during the 2012 season when he played at Syracuse. Previously, he was named the 2007 South Atlantic League Mid-Season All-Star while playing for the Lake County Captains, also a Cleveland affiliate.

Boston Red Sox
Not long after signing him, the Red Sox assigned Rivero to Double A Portland Sea Dogs to start the 2014 season. He then gained a promotion to Triple A Pawtucket Red Sox during the midseason. He struggled after being called up to Triple-A, batting just .179 through eight games in the month of May. But Rivero improved the rest of the way, hitting .319 to go along with a .375 on-base percentage in June. He finished the month with a solid week, recording at least a hit in all seven games to be named the International League Batter of the Week. He went 12-for-28 (.429) during the seven-game span, raising his season average to .286. In addition, Rivero drove in five runs and scored six times, while compiling three extra-base hits, as his efforts helped Pawtucket conclude a 5-2 stretch. He often filled the designated hitter role when he was not playing on the field. Overall, he hit .262/.320/.379 with five homers and 36 RBI in 74 games for Pawtucket before joining the Boston Red Sox.

Major Leagues
After nine seasons in professional baseball, Rivero became a major leaguer when the Red Sox purchased his contract from Pawtucket on August 25, 2014 after placing shortstop Xander Bogaerts on the seven-day concussion disabled list. He made his major league debut on August 29, pinch hitting for Will Middlebrooks. He was walked in his only plate appearance.

Seattle Mariners
Rivero was claimed off waivers by the Seattle Mariners on November 3, 2014 but on December 2, 2014 he was non-tendered and became a free agent. However, they soon re-signed him to a minor league contract.

Second stint with Boston Red Sox
On August 9, 2015, Rivero was traded back to the Boston Red Sox for cash and assigned to Triple-A Pawtucket.

Arizona Diamondbacks
On November 18, 2015, Rivero signed a minor league deal with the Arizona Diamondbacks. He was assigned to Triple-A. Rivero signed a new minor league contract with the Diamondbacks on January 24, 2017. He was released on June 19, 2017.

Tokyo Yakult Swallows
On July 6, 2017, Rivero signed with the Tokyo Yakult Swallows of Nippon Professional Baseball.

Mexican League
On March 20, 2018, Rivero signed with the Toros de Tijuana of the Mexican League. He became a free agent following the season. Rivero signed with the Bravos de León for the 2019 season. On February 16, 2020, Rivero was traded to the Algodoneros de Unión Laguna. Rivero did not play in a game in 2020 due to the cancellation of the LMB season because of the COVID-19 pandemic. In 2021, Rivero batted .278/.338/.456 with 11 home runs and 53 RBIs in 65 games. He became a free agent following the season. On January 13, 2022, Rivero re-signed with the Bravos de León for the 2022 season. On July 14, 2022, he was traded to the Rieleros de Aguascalientes in exchange for P Hayato Takagi. On December 12, 2022, Rivero was traded to the Tecolotes de los Dos Laredos.

Accident
On December 6, 2018, Rivero, Luis Valbuena, and José Castillo were in a car in Yaracuy driven by Rivero's chauffeur when the car struck a rock. The driver tried to avoid it, but crashed. Rivero and the driver survived, but Castillo and Valbuena were killed. Castillo, Rivero, and Valbuena were all members of Venezuelan winter team Cardenales de Lara, and had played a game the day of the accident.

See also
 List of Major League Baseball players from Venezuela

References

External links

 

1988 births
Living people
Akron Aeros players
Algodoneros de Unión Laguna players
Baseball first basemen
Baseball shortstops
Boston Red Sox players
Bravos de León players
Bravos de Margarita players
Burlington Indians players (1986–2006)
Cardenales de Lara players
Gulf Coast Indians players
Harrisburg Senators players
Kinston Indians players
Lake County Captains players
Lehigh Valley IronPigs players
Leones del Caracas players
Major League Baseball players from Venezuela
Major League Baseball third basemen
Mexican League baseball third basemen
Nippon Professional Baseball first basemen
Nippon Professional Baseball third basemen
Pawtucket Red Sox players
Sportspeople from Barquisimeto
Peoria Saguaros players
Portland Sea Dogs players
Reading Phillies players
Reno Aces players
Syracuse Chiefs players
Tacoma Rainiers players
Tecolotes de los Dos Laredos players
Tokyo Yakult Swallows players
Toros de Tijuana players
Venezuelan expatriate baseball players in Japan
Venezuelan expatriate baseball players in Mexico
Venezuelan expatriate baseball players in the United States